The following is a list of mayors of the city of Macapá, in Amapá state, Brazil.

 Joaquim José Romão de Almeida, 1889-1900 	
 Pompeu Aureliano de Moura, 1900-1901 
 Coriolano Jucá, 1895-1896 
 Manuel Teodoro Mendes, 1896-1914
 , 1914-1920
 Alexandre Vaz Tavares, 1920-1921
 , 1921-1922
 Jorge Hurley, 1922-1926
 Otávio Acioli Ramos, 1926-1931
 Jacinto Boutinelli, 1930-1932
 , 1932-1935, 1937, 1942-1944
 Francisco Ramos Soares, 1935-1936
 Sílvio Ferreira Sá, 1938-1941
 João Ferreira Sá, 1941
 Odilardo Gonçalves da Silva, 1944-1945
 Jacy Barata Jucá, 1945-1947
 José Serra e Silva, 1947-1950
 Edílson Borges de Oliveira, 1950-1951, 1955-1956
 Claudomiro de Moraes, 1951, 1952-1954
 Heitor de Azevedo Picanço, 1951-1952, 1957-1961
 Cláudio Carvalho do Nascimento, 1955 
 Ronaldo Tavares Souto Maior, 1961
 Amaury Guimarães Farias, 1961
 Otávio Gonçalves de Oliveira, 1961-1962
 Jacy Barata Jucá, 1962-1963
 João Batista Travassos de Arruda, 1963
 Mário Luiz Barata, 1963-1964
 Edmundo Wanderley Chaves, 1964
 Renée de Azevedo Limmounche, 1964-1965
 Aristeu Loureiro Accioli Ramos, 1965
 , 1965
 Douglas Lobato Lopes, 1965-1967
 Augusto Fernando Porto Carrero, 1967-1968
 Guilherme Paulo Hettenhauser, 1968
 Raimundo Ubaldo Figueira, 1968-1969
 João de Oliveira Côrtes, 1969-1972
 Rubens Antonio Albuquerque, 1972 
 Lourival Benvenuto da Silva, 1973-1974
 Cleyton Figueiredo de Azevedo, 1974-1978 
 Newton Douglas Barata dos Santos, 1978
 Domício Campos de Magalhães, 1978-1980
 , 1980-1985 
 , 1985 
 Raimundo de Azevedo Costa, 1986-1988 
 João Capiberibe, 1989-1992 
 Papaléo Paes, 1993-1996 
 , 1997-2000
 , 2001-2008 
 , 2009-2012 
 , 2013-

See also
 
 
 Macapá history
 Macapá history (in Portuguese)
  (state)
 List of mayors of largest cities in Brazil (in Portuguese)
 List of mayors of capitals of Brazil (in Portuguese)

References

This article incorporates information from the Portuguese Wikipedia.

Further reading
 

Macapa